Almir Rahmanović (born 25 March 1986 in SFR Yugoslavia) is a Slovenian footballer who plays as a striker.

External links
PrvaLiga profile 

1986 births
Living people
Slovenian footballers
Association football forwards
NK Čelik Zenica players
NK Rudar Velenje players
NK Krško players
NK Olimpija Ljubljana (2005) players
NK Ivančna Gorica players
NK Celje players
Slovenian expatriate footballers
Slovenian expatriate sportspeople in Austria
Expatriate footballers in Austria
Expatriate footballers in Switzerland
Slovenian PrvaLiga players